General elections were held in the Dominican Republic in 1866. The president was directly elected for the first time, with José María Cabral receiving 87% of the vote.

Results

President

References

Dominican
1866 in the Dominican Republic
Presidential elections in the Dominican Republic
Elections in the Dominican Republic